The Journal Star is the major daily newspaper for Peoria, Illinois, and surrounding area.  First owned locally, then employee-owned, it became a Copley Press entity in 1996. In 2007, the paper was sold to Fairport, New York-based GateHouse Media.

History
The oldest ancestor of the Journal Star, the Peoria Daily Transcript, was founded by N.C. Nason and first published on December 17, 1855. The Peoria Journal founded as an afternoon paper by Eugene F. Baldwin, the owner of the El Paso Journal and a former editor of the Daily Transcript, and J. B. Barnes, and first publisher on December 3, 1877. Henry Means Pindell started the Peoria Herald in 1889; and soon bought out the Daily Transcript, forming the Herald-Transcript.  Baldwin, who had since left the Journal, started the Peoria Star, with Charles M. Powell on November 7, 1897.  Pindell bought the Journal in 1900, sold the Herald-Transcript in 1902, and, after that newspaper had become the Transcript, bought it back in 1916 and merged it with the Journal, creating the Peoria Journal-Transcript, with the Transcript in the morning and the Journal in the afternoon.

In 1944, the Journal and Transcript and their rival Star combined presses as Peoria Newspapers Inc. with the Star as a morning paper and the Journal-Transcript as an afternoon paper, but retained their competition in journalism until 1954, when a full merger was agreed to.  Once the agreement was reached, both the morning and afternoon papers immediately changed their names to the Journal Star.  To hold the merged newspaper, the current newspaper headquarters were built near War Memorial Drive (U.S. Route 150) and the McClugage Bridge; the first edition from the new presses was on November 14, 1955.

During a newspaper strike in 1958, members of the Newspaper Guild printed a temporary paper, The Peoria Citizen.

In the 1980 presidential election, the Journal Star endorsed Libertarian candidate Ed Clark.

Between 1984 and 1990, the Journal Star Employee Stock Ownership Plan bought about 83 percent of the company, making it effectively employee-owned.  It company also bought the Galesburg Register-Mail of Galesburg, Illinois, in 1989.  However, the success for the employees had the opposite effect for the company itself, as it had to buy back stock of large numbers of early retirees.  The paper was sold to Copley Press, owned by Helen Copley, in 1996; Copley also owned the downstate Illinois papers the State Journal-Register in Springfield, Illinois and the Lincoln Courier.

When Copley purchased the paper in 1996, the daily circulation was 75,000+. According to a Knight Foundation report in 2005, the Journal Star circulation is now 65,126. The Journal Star is the highest-circulation newspaper in downstate Illinois and the fourth-highest circulation Illinois newspaper. As of September 2006, the Journal Star was the 136th-largest newspaper in the United States.

References

External links
pjstar.com — Peoria Journal Star official website

Newspapers established in 1855
1855 establishments in Illinois
Copley Press publications
Newspapers published in Illinois
Gannett publications
Mass media in Peoria, Illinois